Hatfield Moors is a 1400.7 hectare (3461.1 acre) biological site of Special Scientific Interest in South Yorkshire. The site was notified in 1954.  The site is managed by Natural England.

In The Gentleman's Magazine 31 August 1727, George Stovin made reference to Hatfield Moor:  "Here is great plenty of furze buſhes, and variety of game, ſuch as hares, foxes, kites, eagles, curlews, ducks and geeſe; there is no houſe or cottage near it, and but a few old oaks, fallows, and birch; the ſouse is a little ſtud-bound one, and ſeems ready to fall".

SSSI
Hatfield Moors is the remaining part of a once more extensive raised bog in the Humberhead Levels, and is the second largest lowland raised peat bog in England. Much peat has been removed from the site over the years but peat-cutting has now stopped, and the bog is being allowed to regenerate. Underlying the peat are moraines of sand and gravel, which rise to the surface in one place, forming Lindholme Island. The timber used was poles of pine, a reflection on the local availability of the tree at the time it was built.

On drier patches plants include the dwarf shrubs heather and cross-leaved heath, in wetter places common cottongrass, hare's-tail cottongrass, bog cranberry, bog-rosemary, bog-myrtle and several species of Sphagnum moss. The invertebrate fauna includes the rare mire pill beetle, and other uncommon species of beetle, the bog rush cricket and the large heath butterfly. Birds that breed here include various heathland passerines as well as the nightingale, nightjars and three species of owl. The running water in the drainage ditches provides habitat for twelve species of pondweed, greater  bladderwort, arrowhead and the nationally uncommon short-leaved water starwort.

See also
List of Sites of Special Scientific Interest in South Yorkshire
Thorne and Hatfield Moors

References

Sites of Special Scientific Interest notified in 1954
Sites of Special Scientific Interest in South Yorkshire